Vineet Nayar (born 1962) is an Indian business executive, author and philanthropist. He is the former Chief Executive Officer of HCL Technologies (2007–13), Founder Chairman & CEO of Sampark Foundation and author of a critically acclaimed management book "Employees First, Customers Second: Turning Conventional Management Upside Down” (Harvard Business Press, June 2010). which has sold 100,000+ copies.

Biography 
Nayar was born and spent most of his childhood in Pantnagar, a town in the foothill of the Himalayas in the state of Uttarakhand. He completed his schooling from Campus School Pantnagar. He studied for a B. Tech in mechanical engineering from the College of Technology of G. B. Pant University of Agriculture and Technology and a Masters in Business Management at the XLRI- Xavier School of Management, Jamshedpur in India.

Currently, Nayar serves as a Senior Advisor to HCL Corporation. He joined HCL in 1985 after earning his MBA from XLRI. In 1993, he founded Comnet, which grew into a $1 billion dominant leader in the Technology Management business. In 2005, Vineet became President of HCL Technologies and served as the company's CEO from 2007 until January 2013. During these years he helped it grow revenues and market cap by six times which led HCL to win awards for the WorldBlu certified Most Democratic Workplace in the world, Workforce Management Optimas Award for HR Innovation in US, Britain's Top Employers, Best Employer in Asia, and many more.

He has served as Governor of ICT, member of the Global Advisory Board of Women Leader's and Gender Parity Program as well as a Community Partner of the Forum of Young Global Leaders at the World Economic Forum. He has served as a "Mentor‟ (Co-Chair) of WEF's 2011 Annual Meeting of New Champions conference. Vineet has taken up a position on the board of the National Stock Exchange. He is also a member of NPC Tech Platform, National Focus Group (Educational Technology in School Education) Ministry of Education, Government of India. As a mentor to multiple technology start-ups, he continues to follow his passion of turning conventional management wisdom, upside down.

Work 
Nayar narrated the story of his company in the book Employees First, Customers Second: Turning Conventional Management Upside Down (Harvard Business Review Press, 2010), and also outlined the intellectual basis for transformation and lessons learned.

Nayar continues to share knowledge through two blogs—his own scrapbook and a blog at Harvard Business Review website.

Social change advocate
In 2005, Vineet co-founded Sampark Foundation with his wife Anupama Nayar with “innovation-led large scale social change” as the central idea.

Awards and honours
 Selected to the 'Thinkers 50 List', 2011/2012
 Conferred with the 'Leader in the Digital Age' Award at CeBIT, 2011
 Conferred with the 'Business HR Champion Award' at the European HCM Excellence Awards, 2011
 Selected in Fortune Magazine's 'Executive Dream Team' List, 2011
 Ranked No. 2 HR Influencer in India by SHRM India, 2011
 Adjudged as the 'CEO of the Year' in Bloomberg UTVi CXO Awards, 2011
 Conferred the 'IIM Lucknow-Vijaypat Singhania Award for Leadership', 2012
 Conferred with Manpower HEC Prize
Felicitated with France's prestigious Oliver Lecerf Prize
 Cited among Forbes magazine '48 Heroes of Philanthropy 2013'

References

Businesspeople in software
Businesspeople from Uttarakhand
1962 births
Living people
XLRI – Xavier School of Management alumni